Joe C. Meriweather (October 26, 1953 – October 13, 2013) was an American professional basketball player.

A 6'10" center from Southern Illinois University, Meriweather played ten seasons (1975–1985) in the NBA as a member of the Houston Rockets, Atlanta Hawks, New Orleans Jazz, New York Knicks, and Kansas City Kings.  He earned NBA All-Rookie honors in his first season, during which he averaged 10.2 points, 6.4 rebounds, and 1.5 blocks.  Over the course of his NBA career, Meriweather averaged 8.1 points, 5.6 rebounds, and 1.2 blocks.

Of note, Meriweather is one of a select few players who have blocked 10 shots in an NBA game more than once.  Meriweather accomplished the feat twice during his career, first with the Jazz in 1977 (his only career triple double), and then again later with the Knicks in 1979.  Those totals established franchise records for both teams; the Jazz record has since been broken by Mark Eaton numerous times, but Meriweather still holds the record for the Knicks (later tied by Dikembe Mutombo).

He played for the US national team in the 1974 FIBA World Championship, winning the bronze medal.

Meriweather spent the 1985–86 basketball season playing for Granarolo Bologna in Italy.
He coached the Kansas City Mustangs of the Women's Basketball Association professional league to an undefeated season in 1994. He also served as the head women's basketball coach at Park University in Parkville, Missouri from 1997 to 2010 before resigning in March 2010.

Meriweather died on October 13, 2013 in Columbus, Georgia.

See also
List of National Basketball Association players with most blocks in a game

References

1953 births
2013 deaths
African-American basketball players
American women's basketball coaches
American expatriate basketball people in Italy
American expatriate basketball people in Spain
American men's basketball players
Atlanta Hawks players
Basketball players from Alabama
Centers (basketball)
Houston Rockets draft picks
Houston Rockets players
Kansas City Kings players
Liga ACB players
New Orleans Jazz players
New York Knicks players
People from Phenix City, Alabama
Southern Illinois Salukis men's basketball players
United States men's national basketball team players
20th-century African-American sportspeople
21st-century African-American people
1974 FIBA World Championship players